The 2017 McGrath Cup was an inter-county Gaelic football competition in the province of Munster, played by all six county teams. The final was won by Kerry.

Format
The teams are drawn into two groups of three teams. Each team plays the other teams in its group once, earning 2 points for a win and 1 for a draw. The two group winners play in the final.

Group stage

Group A

Group B

Final

References

McGrath Cup
McGrath Cup